Gózd  is a village in the administrative district of Gmina Łączna, within Skarżysko County, Świętokrzyskie Voivodeship, in south-central Poland.

The village has a population of 560. North of Gózd at   there is a 104 metres tall free-standing lattice tower used as radio relay.

References

Villages in Skarżysko County